Wellington Turman (born July 22, 1996) is a Brazilian professional mixed martial artist, currently competing in the middleweight division of the Ultimate Fighting Championship (UFC).

Background
Turman was born and grew up in Curitiba, Brazil. He initially started training Muay Thai to lose weight, but seeing names like Anderson Silva and Jon Jones at UFC that Wellington found, he needed to migrate to MMA.

Mixed martial arts career

Early career 
The premiere in the amateur category took place at 17 years of age. With five wins in five fights in the amateur cartel, Turman turned 18 and decided to start his professional career.

Ultimate Fighting Championship 

Turman made his UFC debut as a late replacement for John Phillips against Karl Roberson on July 13, 2019, at UFC on ESPN+ 13. Turman lost the fight via a controversial split decision.

Turman faced Markus Perez on November 16, 2019, at UFC Fight Night: Błachowicz vs. Jacaré. He won the fight via unanimous decision.

Turman faced Andrew Sanchez on August 8, 2020, at UFC Fight Night 174. He lost the fight via knockout in round one. After the bout, Turman signed a new four-fight contract with the UFC.

Turman was scheduled to face Sean Strickland on October 31, 2020, at  UFC Fight Night 181. However, on September 29, Turman pulled out due to COVID-19 sequelae that rendered him unable to train after his two-week quarantine ended on September 24, 2020.

Turman was scheduled to face Aliaskhab Khizriev on February 6, 2021 at UFC Fight Night 184. However, Turman was forced to withdraw from the bout, diagnosing with pneumonia.

Turman faced UFC newcomer Bruno Silva on June 19, 2021 at UFC on ESPN 25. Turman managed to secure multiple takedowns and took Silva's back, but ultimately lost the fight via knockout late in round one.

Turman faced Sam Alvey on August 28, 2021, at UFC on ESPN 30. Turman repeatedly poked Alvey in the eye throughout the fight, being deducted two points, however he won the fight via split decision.

Turman was scheduled to face Rodolfo Vieira on January 22, 2022 at UFC 270. However after Vieira was forced to withdraw due to medical reasons, the bout was cancelled.

Replacing Makhmud Muradov, Turman faced Misha Cirkunov on February 26, 2022 at UFC Fight Night 202. He won the bout via armbar in the second round. The win earned Turman his first Performance of the Night bonus award with the company.

Turman was scheduled to face Julian Marquez on June 18, 2022 at UFC Fight Night 208.  However, Turman withdrew due to an orbital bone injury and was replaced by Gregory Rodrigues.

Turman faced Andre Petroski on November 12, 2022, at UFC 281. He lost the fight via unanimous decision.

Championships and accomplishments

Mixed martial arts
Ultimate Fighting Championship
Performance of the Night (One time)

Mixed martial arts record

|-
|Loss
|align=center|18–6
|Andre Petroski
|Decision (unanimous)
|UFC 281
|
|align=center|3
|align=center|5:00
|New York City, New York, United States
|
|-
|Win
|align=center|18–5
|Misha Cirkunov
|Submission (armbar)
|UFC Fight Night: Makhachev vs. Green
|
|align=center|2
|align=center|1:29
|Las Vegas, Nevada, United States
|
|-
|Win
|align=center|17–5
|Sam Alvey
|Decision (split)
|UFC on ESPN: Barboza vs. Chikadze
|
|align=center|3
|align=center|5:00
|Las Vegas, Nevada, United States
|
|-
|Loss
|align=center|16–5
|Bruno Silva
|KO (punches)
|UFC on ESPN: The Korean Zombie vs. Ige
|
|align=center|1
|align=center|4:45
|Las Vegas, Nevada, United States
|
|-
|Loss
|align=center|16–4
|Andrew Sanchez
|KO (punch)
|UFC Fight Night: Lewis vs. Oleinik
|
|align=center| 1
|align=center| 4:14
|Las Vegas, Nevada, United States
|
|-
|Win
|align=center|16–3
|Markus Perez
|Decision (unanimous)
|UFC Fight Night: Błachowicz vs. Jacaré 
|
|align=center|3
|align=center|5:00
|São Paulo, Brazil
|
|-
|Loss
|align=center|15–3
|Karl Roberson
|Decision (split)
|UFC Fight Night: de Randamie vs. Ladd 
|
|align=center|3
|align=center|5:00
|Sacramento, California, United States
|
|-
|Win
|align=center|15–2
|Marcio Alexandre Jr.
|Submission (rear-naked choke)
|Future FC 4: Turman vs. Lyoto
|
|align=center| 1
|align=center| 3:10
|São Paulo, Brazil
|
|-
|Win
|align=center|14–2
|Rafael Atilio
|Decision (unanimous)
|Imortal FC 10: Clash of the Titans
|
|align=center| 3
|align=center| 5:00
|Curitiba, Brazil
|
|-
|Win
|align=center|13–2
|Rodrigo Jesus
|Decision (unanimous)
|Imortal FC 7
|
|align=center| 3
|align=center| 5:00
|São José dos Pinhais, Brazil
|
|-
|Win
|align=center|12–2
|Sergio de Fatima
|Submission (guillotine choke)
|Brave 8: The Rise of Champions
|
|align=center| 1
|align=center| 1:27
|Curitiba, Brazil
|
|-
|Loss
|align=center|11–2
|Carlston Harris
|Decision (unanimous)
|Imortal FC 6
|
|align=center| 3
|align=center| 5:00
|Curitiba, Brazil
|
|-
|Win
|align=center|11–1
|Dyego Roberto
|Decision (unanimous)
|Imortal FC 5: Road to Pancrase
|
|align=center| 3
|align=center| 5:00
|São José dos Pinhais, Brazil
|
|-
|Win
|align=center|10–1
|Caio Rodrigues
|Submission (rear-naked choke)
|Imortal FC 4: Dynamite
|
|align=center| 1
|align=center| 2:09
|São José dos Pinhais, Brazil
|
|-
|Win
|align=center|9–1
|Cleiton Butiski
|TKO (punches)
|University of Champions 7
|
|align=center| 1
|align=center| 0:26
|Curitiba, Brazil
|
|-
|Loss
|align=center|8–1
|Gian Siqueira
|Decision (unanimous)
|XFC International 12
|
|align=center| 3
|align=center| 5:00
|São Paulo, Brazil
|
|-
|Win
|align=center|8–0
|Josimar Lara
|Submission (rear-naked choke)
|Gladiator Combat Fight 14
|
|align=center| 1
|align=center| 1:37
|Curitiba, Brazil
|
|-
|Win
|align=center|7–0
|Ewerton Ferreira
|Decision (unanimous)
|Max Fight 14
|
|align=center| 3
|align=center| 5:00
|Campinas, Brazil
|
|-
|Win
|align=center|6–0
|Diego Siqueira
|TKO
|Curitiba Fight Pro 3
|
|align=center| 1
|align=center| 1:56
|Curitiba, Brazil
|
|-
|Win
|align=center|5–0
|Leandro Vasconcelos
|Submission (guillotine choke)
|Power Fight Extreme 12
|
|align=center| 1
|align=center| 4:30
|Curitiba, Brazil
|
|-
|Win
|align=center|4–0
|Edivaldo Siqueira
|KO (punches)
|Arena Force 4
|
|align=center| 2
|align=center| 3:00
|Jaraguá do Sul, Brazil
|
|-
|Win
|align=center|3–0
|Thiago Nata
|TKO (punches)
|The Hill Fighters 4
|
|align=center| 2
|align=center| 4:55
|São José dos Pinhais, Brazil
|
|-
|Win
|align=center|2–0
|Wellington Machado
|Submission (guillotine choke)
|Striker's House Cup 41
|
|align=center| 1
|align=center| 3:05
|Curitiba, Brazil
|
|-
|Win
|align=center|1–0
|Diego Pedroso
|Submission (rear-naked choke)
|Curitiba Fight Pro 2
|
|align=center| 2
|align=center| 1:15
|Curitiba, Brazil
|
|-

See also 
 List of current UFC fighters
 List of male mixed martial artists

References

External links 
  
 

1996 births
Living people
Brazilian male mixed martial artists
Middleweight mixed martial artists
Mixed martial artists utilizing Muay Thai
Mixed martial artists utilizing Brazilian jiu-jitsu
Brazilian practitioners of Brazilian jiu-jitsu
People awarded a black belt in Brazilian jiu-jitsu
Brazilian Muay Thai practitioners
Sportspeople from Curitiba
Ultimate Fighting Championship male fighters